West Pennard railway station was a station on the Highbridge branch of the Somerset and Dorset Joint Railway. Opened on 3 February 1862, it was reduced to halt status on 25 June 1962. Originally the S&DJR main line, the railway was reduced to branch status when the extension to Bath was built. A passing point on the single line, the station was adjacent to a level crossing on the A361 road from Shepton Mallet to Glastonbury. The station closed with the railway on 7 March 1966.

The site today

The station building has not changed much since closure and is owned by a transport company and used as a house.

Reading

References

External links
http://www.sdjr.net/locations/west_pennard.html
 Station on navigable O.S. map

Disused railway stations in Somerset
Former Somerset and Dorset Joint Railway stations
Railway stations in Great Britain opened in 1862
Railway stations in Great Britain closed in 1966
Beeching closures in England
1862 establishments in England